Temple cars are chariots that are used to carry representations of Hindu gods. The car is usually used on festival days, when many people pull the cart. 

The size of the largest temple cars inspired the Anglo-Indian term Juggernaut (from Jagannath), signifying a tremendous, virtually unstoppable force or phenomenon.

The procession of the Asia's largest and greatest temple car of Thiruvarur Thiyagarajar Temple in Tamil Nadu features prominently in an ancient festival held in the town. The annual chariot festival of the Thygarajaswamy temple is celebrated during April – May, corresponding to the Tamil month of Chitrai. The chariot is the largest of its kind in Asia and India weighing 300 tonne with a height of 90 feet. The chariot comes around the four main streets surrounding the temple during the festival. The event is attended by lakhs of people from all over Tamil Nadu. 

The Aazhi Ther is the biggest temple chariot in Tamil Nadu. The 30-foot tall temple car, which originally weighed 220 ton, is raised to 96 feet with bamboo sticks and decorative clothes, taking its total weight to 350 tons. Mounted on the fully decorated temple car, the presiding deity – Lord Shiva – went around the four streets with the devotees pulling it using huge ropes. Two bulldozers were engaged to provide the required thrust so that devotees could move the chariot.

As of 2004, Tamil Nadu had 515 wooden carts, 79 of which needed repairs. Annamalaiyar Temple, Tiruvannamalai, Chidambaram Natarajar Temple are among the temples that possess these huge wooden chariots for regular processions. The Natarajar Temple celebrates the chariot festival twice a year; once in the summer (Aani Thirumanjanam, which takes place between June and July) and another in winter (Marghazhi Thiruvaadhirai, which takes place between December and January). Lord Krishna of Udupi has five temple cars, namely Brahma ratha (the largest), Madya ratha (medium), kinyo (small), and the silver and gold rathas.

Gallery

List of places with temple cars 

 Aragalur
 Avinashi (Sri Avanashiappar Temple)
 Banavasi, Karnataka
 Bantwal, Karnataka
 Bhavani Kooduthoorai, Tamil Nadu (4 chariots ) 
 Bhubaneswar, Odisha
 Chamundeshwari Temple, Mysuru
 Chettikulangara, Kerala (Chettikulangara Devi Temple)
 Cherai, Kerala
 Colombo, Sri Lanka
 Coimbatore, Tamil Nadu (Koniamman Temple)
 Chidambaram, Tamil Nadu (Nataraja Temple)
 Dindigul (Abiramiyamman Kovil)
 Denkanikottai  (Betarayaswamy Kovil)
 Devanathaswamy temple, Thiruvanthipuram, Cuddalore District, Tamil Nadu
 Erode (Chennimalai, Sivagiri, Sivanmalai)
 Gobichettipalayam (Sri Kondathukalaimman Temple, Sri Balamurugan Temple, etc.)
 George Town, Malaysia (Nattukkottai Chettiar Temple)
 Hamm, Germany (Sri Kamadchi Ampal Temple)
 Hampi, Karnataka (Stone Chariot built by Vijayanagara Kings
 Karinjeshwara, Karnataka ((Mahathobhara shri Parvathi-Parameshwra )Karinjeshwara Temple)
 Kadiri, Andhra Pradesh (Sri Khadri Lakshmi Narasimha Swami Temple)
 Kumbakonam (Sri Saarangapani Temple and others)
 Koduru, Andhra Pradesh
 Karnataka (Sri Mahabaleshwara Temple Gokarna)
 Karuvalur (Shri Mariamman Kovil)
 Kallal Town (Somasundareswarer Kovil)
 Kancheepuram (Ekaambaranathar Kovil)
 Karamadai, Tamil Nadu
 Kateel, Karnataka, (Shri Durga Parameshwari Temple)
 Mookambika Temple, Kollur Karnataka
 Kanchipuram
 Kuala lumpur, Malaysia (Seri Maha Mariamman Temple Devasthanam)
 Kadayanallur
 Mannargudi (Sri vidhya Rajagopalaswamy temple)
 Mylapore, Chennai (Kapaleeshwarar Temple)
 Manali New Town, (Aiyya Temple)
 Minjur, ( Sri Ekambaranatha temple)
 Mulki, Karnataka (Shree Venkataramana Temple) 
 Mulki, Karnataka, (Shree Kalikamba Temple)
 Mulki, Karnataka (Shri Bappanadu Temple)
 Mangalore, karnataka (Shri Venkataraman temple)
 Mangalore, Karnataka
 Madurai – (Sri Meenakshi Amman Temple and others)
 North Authoor (Sri Somanathar Somasundari Temple)
 Perur (Patteewarar Temple)
 Puttur, Karnataka, (Shri Maha Lingeshsara Temple)
 Padaleeswarar temple, Cuddalore, Tamil Nadu
 Palani, Tamil Nadu
 Palakkad, Kerala (Many temples in settlements of Palakkad)
 Puri, Odisha
 Srikanteshwara Temple, Nanjangud, Mysuru
 Sakkottai, (Karaikudi)
 Srivaikuntam (Sri Srivaikuntanathan Permual Temple – Fourth largest temple car in Tamil Nadu)
 Suchindram (Thanumalayan Temple)
 Srivilliputtur (Sri Andal Temple - Second largest temple car in Tamil Nadu)
 Salem, Tamil Nadu (Elampillai, Aranagalur, Rasipuram)
 Sholinghur Sri Lakshmi Narasimha  Swamy temple,Sholinghur.
 Suratkal, Karnataka
 Teluk Intan, (Nagarathaar Sri Thendayuthapani)
 Tirunelveli (Sri Nellaiappar Temple – Third largest temple car in Tamil Nadu)
 Tiruchengode (Sri Arthanareeswarar Temple - Fourth largest temple car in Tamil Nadu) 
 Tiruvannamalai (Annamalaiyar, unnamulai amman temple, 5 Chariots)
 Tirupattur (Aruilmigu Muthukumara Swamy Thirukkovil, God Shiva chariot)
 Thirthahalli
 Tiruvallur
 Tiruvidaimarudur (Mahalinga Swamy) Schariots 
 Thungapuram (Ariyalur-Perambalur)
 Trincomalee, Sri Lanka (Koneswaram temple) 
 Thiruvarur (Thiyagarajar Temple - First largest temple car in Asia)
 Thiruthangal (Perumal Kovil)
 Thirukoshtiyur (Sri Sowmiya Narayana Perumal Kovil)
 Udupi, Karnataka
 Virudhunagar
 Vasudevanallur( sri cinthamani nathar temple(arthanathiswarar temple)
 Yanam
 Lalgudi (Saptharishishwarar Temple)
 Srimushnam (boovaraha Swami temple car- second largest temple car in Tamilnadu)
 Tiruchendur Sri Subramanya Swami temple

List of temples/cities with golden cars

Puducherry 
 Sri Arulmigu Manakula Vinayagar, Pondicherry, Puducherry

Karnataka 
 Sri Krishna matha, Udupi
Shri Durga Parameshwari temple, Kateel
Shri Mahabaleshwar temple, Gokarna
Mookambika Temple, Kollur
Mahalasa Narayani Temple, konchady, mangalore

Tamil Nadu 

 Arulmigu Maruntheeswar, Thiruvanmiyur, Chennai
 Arulmigu Devi Karumariamman, Thiruverkadu, Chennai
 Arulmigu Vadapalani Andavar, Vadapalani, Chennai
 Arulmigu Kamatchiamman, Mangadu, Chennai
 Arulmigu Kanthaswamy, Parktown, Chennai
 Arulmigu Mundakakanniamman, Mylapore, Chennai
 Arulmigu Kapaleeswarar, Mylapore, Chennai
 Arulmigu Subramaniaswamy, Maruthamalai, Coimbatore
 Arulmigu Eachanari Vinayagar, Coimbatore
 Arulmigu Thandumariamman, Coimbatore
 Arulmigu MeenakshiSundareswarar, Madurai
 Arulmigu Solaimalai Murugan, Pazhamudircholai, Alagarkovil Madurai
 Arulmigu Jambukeswarar, Thiruvanaikkaval, Trichy
 Arulmigu Nellaiappar Temple, Tirunelveli
 Arulmigu Ramanathaswamy, Rameswaram
 Arulmigu Subramaniaswamy, Thiruchendur
 Arulmigu Kamatchiamman, Kanchipuram
 Arulmigu Dandayuthapaniswamy, Palani
 Arulmigu Swaminathaswamy, Swamimalai
 Arulmigu Subramanyaswamy, Thiruttani
 Arulmigu Anjaneyaswamy, Namakkal
 Arulmigu Pachaimalai Murugan, Gobichettipalayam
 Arulmigu Pariyur Kondathu Kaliamman, Gobichettipalayam
 Arulmigu Mariamman, Bannari, Erode
 Arulmigu Velayuthaswamy, Thindalmalai, Erode
 Arulmigu Arthanareeswarar, Tiruchengode
 Arulmigu Subramaniyaswamy, Sivanmalai, Tirupur
 Arulmigu Kottaimariamman, Dindigul
 Arulmigu Arunachaleswarar, Thiruvannamalai
 Arulmigu Vaidhyanathaswamy, Vaitheeswaran Kovil
 Arulmigu Mahalinga Swamy Temple, Thiruvidaimarudur (SILVER CHARIOT)
 Arulmigu SankaraNarayanaswamy, Sankarankovil
 Arulmigu Vanamamalai Perumal, Nanguneri
 Arulmigu Balamurugan, Raththinagiri
 Arulmigu Mariamman, Samayapuram
 Arulmigu Masaniamman, Anamalai
 Arulmigu Mathurakaliyamman, Siruvachur, Perambalur District
 Arulmigu Angalaparameshwari Amman, Melmalayanur, Villupuram District
 Arulmigu Natarajar Temple, Chidambaram, Cuddalore District - the chariot for Pichandavar on the eighth day of 10-day long festival

 Arulmigu Yoga Lakshmi Narasimar temple, Sholinghur, Ranipet district.

Andhra Pradesh 
  Lord Shiva temple
 Narasimhaswami temple and tirumala Sri vari ratham

See also 
 Ratha
 Carroccio
 Types of carriages

References 

Chariots
Tamil culture